Reese James Llewellyn (30 August 1862 – 15 December 1936) was a Welsh-American businessman. He was the co-founder and president of Llewellyn Iron Works, a company based in Los Angeles, which provided iron works and steel for the construction of buildings in Southern California, the Western United States, Mexico, and South America. The company also produced steel from iron ore and during the World War I shipbuilding boom it was one of the largest manufacturers of triple-expansion steam engines on the West Coast.

Early life
Llewellyn was born in the parish of Llangiwg near Pontardawe in Glamorganshire, Wales, the third of six sons born to David and Hannah (née: James) Llewellyn. His father was an engineer and fitter at an iron works. He emigrated to the United States, first settling in San Francisco, California.

Career

Llewellyn was the co-founder of Llewellyn Bros with his brothers in Los Angeles, California in 1889. Llewellyn served as its president, while his brother William was vice-president and his other brother David was secretary.

The firm provided the ironwork inside the Bradbury Building in Los Angeles in the early 1890s. By 1905, it had provided ironwork and steel work in Southern California, but also in Nevada, Arizona, New Mexico as well as abroad in Mexico and South America. Many skyscrapers in Los Angeles were built with steel from the firm. In 1929, the company merged with the Consolidated Steel Corporation.

Additionally, Llewellyn served as the president of the Helsby Red Sandstone Company in 1895. He also served on the board of directors of the Home Savings Bank of Los Angeles in 1905.

NOTE: all dates before the colon are newspaper publishing dates

17 May 1894: Llewellyn Iron Works is incorporated with $100,000 capital stock.

24 July 1895: Llewellyn J. Llewellyn, president of LIW, dies at age 38.

3 January 1897: overview of LIW as one of LA's biggest companies. Plant between San Fernando, Magdalena, Railroad and North Main streets.

30 November 1902: full page ad touts LIW.

3 September 1905: Summary article, 6 acre plant at North Main and Redondo streets.

7 June 1906: LIW contemplates moving plant to Long Beach or San Pedro. Does not follow through.

25 December 1910. The plant of LIW is bombed.

28 September 1912. LIW plans to build new plant at Torrance. Are now employing 700 men at a 5 acre plant on North Broadway [which is adjacent to N. Main street]. Old plant is to be moved to new location.

Work on the Torrance plant to begin after completion of the new concrete bridge over El Prado in July 1914.

(1 March 1938): Construction of the plant is delayed by an economic depression.

5 February 1916: Concrete foundations of Torrance plant to be laid.

13 September 1916. Torrance plant begins operations.

12 July 1917. LIW plans to build a plant on the West Basin in San Pedro for fitting out ships. Hulls to be towed from San Francisco and Puget Sound yards to San Pedro to receive boilers and engines.

 Advertisement: "LIW builds a 2,800hp marine engine every 6 days"
 4-page walkthrough of the Torrance mill and Los Angeles shops in May 1919 issue of the Pacific Marine Review: 
 3-exp 24.5-41.5-72 cylinder diameters, 48 inch stroke (all engine data taken from Lloyd's register, this list is not comprehensive)
 The San Pedro-based Los Angeles Shipbuilding and Dry Dock Company is absent here, they built their own engines, as did Ames in Seattle. Furthermore, a portion of West Coast-built cargo ships were fitted with turbines and the Joshua Hendy Iron Works supplied the same market with triple-expansion engines, albeit on a smaller scale. The Hamilton, Ohio - based company of Hooven-Owens-Rentschler shipped another large portion of triple expansion engines to West Coast yards. Llewellyn Iron Works manufactured the engines for the following ships:
 built by the Long Beach Shipbuilding Company in Long Beach
 built by Southwestern Shipbuilding in San Pedro
 built by the San Francisco Shipbuilding Company in Oakland
 , 
 built by the Moore Shipbuilding Company in Oakland
 built by the Union Construction Company in Oakland
 
 built by the J. F. Duthie & Company in Seattle
 built by G. M. Standifer Construction in Vancouver
 built by the Columbia River Shipbuilding Company in Portland
 , 

 3-exp 27-47-78, 48 inch stroke
 Union Construction Company, Oakland: 

 a 24-34-51-74 by 54 inch stroke four-cylinder engine
 Southwestern Shipbuilding in San Pedro: 

 3-exp 19-32-56 diameter, 36-inch stroke, for wooden steamships
 built by Meacham & Babcock in Seattle: , 
 built by Seaborn Shipbuilding in Tacoma: 
 built by Hammond Lumber Co. in Humboldt Bay: 
 built by G.F. Rodgers in Astoria: 

 15.5-26-44 diameter, 26 inch stroke, for wooden steamers
 built by Fulton Shipbuilding, Wilmington
 2 engines on twin screw 

24 July 1020. LIW installed gas and electric furnace at Torrance. "Southern California will take a position in the first rank as an iron producing center, it is said".

11 April 1923. The Columbia Steel Company (Pittsburg, California) takes over the LIW Torrance plant.

Civic life
Llewellyn was a member of the Business Men's Association of Los Angeles, alongside businessmen Walter Newhall, Frank Hicks, John H. Norton, Hancock Banning, Joseph Schoder, James Cuzner, H. E. Graves, and William Lacy. Together, they opposed the closing of saloons in 1905.

By the 1920s, Llewellyn served as the vice president of the Better America Federation for Los Angeles County.

Death
Llewellyn suffered a stroke onboard the Grace Line ocean liner  on her trip between Valparaíso and New York City, where he died in 1936. His remains are interred, alongside his parents and siblings, in the Forest Lawn Memorial Park (Glendale).

References

External links
 Berkeley Square  Historic Los Angeles
 Behind the Scenes in the Oviatt Building: Llewellyn Iron Works Elevator Mechanism  YouTube
 Brynamman's Llewellyn brothers building backbone of LA  South Wales Guardian 
 Early Los Angeles Street Lights  Water and Power Associates
 How Iron & Steel Helped Los Angeles Forge a Modern Metropolis  KCET 
 The Huntington Library  Llewellyn Iron Works (photo) 
 Llewellyn Apartments  Downtown Los Angeles News
 Llewellyn Apartments  Llewellyn Apartments
 Llewellyn Iron Works Elevators  Archives.org
 Reese James Llewellyn  FindaGrave
 Smithsonian  Trade catalogs from Llewellyn Iron Works

1862 births
1936 deaths
Welsh emigrants to the United States
People from San Francisco
Businesspeople from Los Angeles
People from Glamorgan